Baxendale is a surname. Notable people with the surname include:

 Christabel Baxendale (1886–1953?), English violinist and composer
 Ciara Baxendale (born 1995), British actress
 Helen Baxendale (born 1970), English actress
 James Baxendale (footballer, born 1992), English footballer
 James Baxendale (footballer, born pre-1900), English footballer
 Leo Baxendale (1930–2017), British cartoonist
 Paul Baxendale-Walker, English talk show host and former lawyer
 Ray Baxendale, New Zealand rugby league player
 Trevor Baxendale, novelist

See also
 Hadley v Baxendale, lawsuit

References 

English-language surnames
Surnames of English origin